Adam Jones (born 3 November 1993 in swansea) is a Welsh rugby referee. He has been a member of Wales' professional rugby union ranks since 2020.

Career

Jones, who began refereeing aged 12, began refereeing on the World Rugby Sevens Series in 2018. He refereed during the 2020 Olympics, before committing to the 15-aside game full time.

References

Living people
1993 births
Welsh rugby union referees
Sportspeople from Brecon
United Rugby Championship referees